Willie Hebert Jefferson III (born January 31, 1991) is a Canadian football defensive end for the Winnipeg Blue Bombers of the Canadian Football League (CFL). Jefferson is a 3-time Grey Cup champion, winning his first ring at the 103rd Grey Cup with Edmonton in 2015. He then won the 107th and 108th Grey Cups when his Blue Bombers defeated the Hamilton Tiger-Cats 33–12 in 2019, and then again in 2021, 33-25. He was named the CFL's Most Outstanding Defensive Player in 2019 with the Bombers, and is a three-time CFL and CFL West All-Star. Jefferson played college football at Stephen F. Austin University, he has also been a member of the Houston Texans, Edmonton Eskimos, Saskatchewan Roughriders, and Washington Redskins.

Early years
He attended Ozen High School. He was selected to the 4A all-state second-team in his senior year in high school. He was selected to the First-team All-District 20-4 and Port Arthur News Super Team while at high school.

College career
He started his career as a wide receiver at Baylor University but was kicked off of the team after he and teammate Josh Gordon were found asleep in Jefferson's car at a local Taco Bell with marijuana in the car. Jefferson, who was driving, was kicked off the team due to it being his second violation. He transferred to Stephen F Austin and was named 2011 Southland Conference Newcomer of the Year in his Junior season.  He led the Southland Conference in sacks with 16. He was selected to the Sports Network All-America second team, Phil Steele's Magazine All-America third team.

Professional career

Houston Texans
On April 27, 2013, he signed with the Houston Texans as an undrafted free agent following the 2013 NFL Draft.

The Texans released Jefferson, along with two others players, on October 21, 2013 for unspecified violations of team rules prior to a game in Kansas City.

Edmonton Eskimos
In 2014, Jefferson signed with the Edmonton Eskimos of the Canadian Football League (CFL). Jefferson played for two seasons with the Eskimos, playing in 35 games, contributing 40 defensive tackles, 10 quarterback sacks, and three forced fumbles.

Washington Redskins
Jefferson signed a futures contract with the Washington Redskins on January 14, 2016. On August 27, 2016, Jefferson was waived by the Redskins.

Saskatchewan Roughriders 
In September 2016, Jefferson returned to the CFL and signed with the Saskatchewan Roughriders rejoining his head coach from Edmonton. Jefferson was named a CFL All-Star in 2017, and in 2018 was nominated as the teams Most Outstanding Player and Most Outstanding Defensive Player after recording his first season with double digit sacks, and a pair of interceptions returned for touchdowns. Jefferson was again named to the CFL All-Star Team alongside teammate Charleston Hughes.

Winnipeg Blue Bombers 
On February 12, 2019, it was announced that Jefferson had signed a one-year deal with the Winnipeg Blue Bombers through the 2019 season. Jefferson felt the Roughriders' offer did not match his market value; he was also courted by the Toronto Argonauts, but signed with the Blue Bombers for $210,000 CND. Jefferson's most notable performance came against Edmonton, where he recorded four tackles (two for a loss), three sacks, two forced fumbles, recovered another fumble, knocked down two passes, recovered an onside kick attempt, and scored a rouge when he kicked a fumble through the endzone. 

By season's end, Jefferson played in all 18 games and made 24 tackles and caught an interception; he also set new career highs for sacks and forced fumbles, with 12 and 6 respectively, he also set the CFL record for a defensive lineman with 16 pass knockdowns. Jefferson's strong play in the playoffs, together with his fellow defensive linemen Jackson Jeffcoat, Drake Nevis, and Jake Thomas saw the Bombers defence control the games against the Calgary Stampeders and Saskatchewan Roughriders, to lead the Bombers to the 107th Grey Cup. In the championship game Jefferson had two tackles, three sacks, two forced fumbles, with a dominant performance that saw the Bombers end their 29 year Grey Cup drought. After the game he said that "I just had to come out here and give it my all. I had my dad, my mom, my wife and my daughter. I couldn't come out here and play a mediocre game in front of my family." For the second consecutive year, Jefferson won the award for both Most Outstanding Player, and Defensive Player for his team, he ultimately won the CFL Most Outstanding Defensive Player Award for his performance over the course of the 2019 CFL season.

After the season, Jefferson had a tryout with the Miami Dolphins which had gone well and he turned down other NFL tryouts. Prior to the next season, Jefferson signed a two year contract extension keeping him in Winnipeg through the 2021 season at approximately $265,000 a year. Unfortunately the 2020 CFL season was cancelled as a result of the pandemic but Jefferson would return to the Winnipeg Blue Bombers for the 2021 season.

Jefferson would help the Blue Bombers thrive in their title defending season. Winnipeg finished the season with the best record in the CFL and Jefferson and the Bombers defence led the league in yards and points allowed. He finished the season with seven sacks, 18 tackles, three forced fumbles, and two interceptions with one of those returned for a touchdown. Jefferson's stellar play meant that he was named a CFL All-Star for the fourth season in a row. The Bombers would defeat the Roughriders to go to the 108th Grey Cup and defend their title. In the 2021 Grey Cup final game, Willie Jefferson and the Blue Bombers top rated defensive unit helped the team to their 12th Grey Cup title, and second in a row, defeating the hometown Hamilton Tiger-Cats in Overtime, 33 - 25. After the extra time win Jefferson said that "We’re behind enemy lines, fans on our backs, city against us and we had to come out here and show these guys who we are. If it had to go into overtime to do that, that’s where we did it. It was tense, but we just had to stick it out. I had no doubt at all."

Jefferson continued his stellar play in the 2022 CFL season, contributing with 33 defensive tackles, seven sacks, two forced fumbles, one interception and one touchdown. Jefferson was named a West-Division All-Star for the fifth consecutive season. The Bombers went to their third consecutive Grey Cup match but were defeated by the Toronto Argonauts. Following the season, on November 26, 2022, Jefferson and the Bombers agreed to a one-year contract extension.

Statistics

CFL

References

External links

Edmonton Eskimos bio 
Baylor Bears bio 
Stephen F. Austin bio
Houston Texans bio

1991 births
Living people
American football defensive ends
American football linebackers
American players of Canadian football
Edmonton Elks players
Houston Texans players
Washington Redskins players
Saskatchewan Roughriders players
Sportspeople from Beaumont, Texas
Stephen F. Austin Lumberjacks football players
Buffalo Bills players
Canadian football defensive linemen
Players of American football from Texas
Baylor Bears football players
Winnipeg Blue Bombers players
Canadian Football League Most Outstanding Defensive Player Award winners